The Queen's Lawn is a green lawned area situated at the centre of Imperial College London's South Kensington campus, next to the Queen's Tower and immediately to the north of Imperial College Road. It provides an open space of 1,600 sq metres, and is surrounded by the Central Library, and the Sherfield administration, Chemistry, and Skempton buildings. It is often the site of college events, including student bands, fairs, and balls, as well as student activism.

In April 2006, the Imperial College student newspaper Felix reported  that the college was seeking permission of Westminster City Council to develop part of the lawn into a three-storey modular building, however this has not come to pass. A weekly farmer's market is held on Tuesdays, and Queen's Lawn was also the site of a world record attempt for the largest jelly mosaic.

References

Year of establishment missing
Imperial College London
Parks and open spaces in the City of Westminster